Bhandup West is one of the 26 Maharashtra Legislative Assembly constituencies located in the Mumbai Suburban district. For national elections, it is part of the Mumbai North East Lok Sabha constituency along with five other Vidhan Sabha segments, namely Mulund, Ghatkopar West, Ghatkopar East, Mankhurd Shivaji Nagar and Vikhroli in the Mumbai Suburban district.

Members of Legislative Assembly

Election results

2019

2014

2009

See also
 List of constituencies of Maharashtra Vidhan Sabha

References

Assembly constituencies of Mumbai
Assembly constituencies of Maharashtra
Politics of Mumbai Suburban district